The puddle frog is a genus of Sub-Saharan frogs that form the monogeneric family Phrynobatrachidae.

Puddle frog may also refer to:

 Common puddle frog, a frog found in the Philippines
 Green puddle frog, a frog found in Bangladesh, Cambodia, China, Hong Kong, India, Indonesia, Laos, Malaysia, Myanmar, Thailand, Vietnam, and possibly Nepal
 Sulawesian puddle frog, a frog endemic to Indonesia
 Sumatran puddle frog, a frog endemic to Indonesia

Animal common name disambiguation pages